Sedliště is a municipality and village in Svitavy District in the Pardubice Region of the Czech Republic. It has about 200 inhabitants.

History
The first written mention of Sedliště is from 1305.

References

Villages in Svitavy District